Rogil is a Portuguese civil parish in Aljezur Municipality. It lies within the Southwest Alentejo and Vicentine Coast Natural Park. The population in 2011 was 1,126, in an area of 34.96 km².

The village of Rogil lies on a plateau at about 95 metres above sea level. There is no church listed on the diocesan website.

Adjacent parishes
The parish is bordered by:
 north - Odeceixe
 east - Marmelete
 south - Aljezur
 west - Atlantic Ocean.

References

External links
 Junta de Freguesia do Rogil

Villages in the Algarve
Freguesias of Aljezur